Francis Brooks Chadwick (January 1, 1850–1942/43), was an American painter active in France.

He was born in Boston and studied at Harvard, and to pursue his interest in art he attended the Académie Julian in Paris. He was friends with the painter John Singer Sargent and travelled with him to Haarlem in 1880. The following year he married the Swedish painter Emma Löwstädt-Chadwick and they settled in Grez-sur-Loing, where he remained the rest of his life, though the couple travelled to other summer art colonies on vacation.

He is known for scenes of Grez.

References

Francis Brooks Chadwick on Artnet

1850 births
1943 deaths
Artists from Boston
Harvard University alumni
19th-century American painters
American male painters
20th-century American painters
American expatriates in France
19th-century American male artists
20th-century American male artists